Rivière-du-Loup is a regional county municipality in the Bas-Saint-Laurent region of Quebec, Canada. Its most important city is Rivière-du-Loup, which contains more than half of the population.

Major industries include pulp and paper, other wood products, peat products, mineral products and textiles.

The name comes from the French, "River of the Wolf".

Subdivisions
There are 13 subdivisions and one native reserve within the RCM:

Cities & Towns (2)
 Rivière-du-Loup
 Saint-Antonin

Municipalities (9)
 Cacouna
 L'Isle-Verte
 Notre-Dame-du-Portage
 Saint-Cyprien
 Saint-Épiphane
 Saint-François-Xavier-de-Viger
 Saint-Hubert-de-Rivière-du-Loup
 Saint-Modeste
 Saint-Paul-de-la-Croix

Parishes (2)
 Notre-Dame-des-Sept-Douleurs
 Saint-Arsène

Native Reserves (1)
Kataskomiq

Transportation

Access Routes
Highways and numbered routes that run through the municipality, including external routes that start or finish at the county border:

Autoroutes

Principal Highways

Secondary Highways

External Routes
None

See also
 List of regional county municipalities and equivalent territories in Quebec

References

Regional county municipalities in Bas-Saint-Laurent
Census divisions of Quebec
Rivière-du-Loup